London to Brighton is a 2006 British neo-noir crime film written and directed by Paul Andrew Williams.

Plot
The film opens with a woman and child, Kelly and Joanne, bursting into a London toilet. Joanne is crying and Kelly has a black eye. Eventually Kelly gets them on a train to Brighton, and it is clear they are running from someone.

Joanne is an eleven-year-old runaway who is procured by a reluctant Kelly into having sex with an old violent mobster who is a paedophile. Kelly's pimp, Derek, bullies her into complying, but it all goes horribly wrong, and the old mobster is killed, presumably by one of the girls. The older man's son, Stuart, then forces Derek to find the girls. The film follows the duo's flight from London in the wake of what has happened.

Arriving initially in Brighton, Kelly visits her friend Karen and tries to earn enough money through prostituting herself to help Joanne afford the train to Devon, where the child's grandmother lives. The two are eventually tracked down by her pimp and his associate and taken to meet Stuart at a secluded field. Upon arrival, Kelly's pimp and associate are made to dig two graves, presumably for the girls. However, Stuart decides that the girls are the victims in this episode and decides instead to kill Kelly's pimp and associate. The film ends with Kelly and Joanne arriving at Joanne's grandma's house in Devon. Kelly watches from a distance as the girl and the grandmother hug, then turns away.

Main cast
 Lorraine Stanley as Kelly
 Georgia Groome as Joanne
 Sam Spruell as Stuart Allen
 Alexander Morton as Duncan Allen
 Johnny Harris as Derek
 Chloe Bale as Karen
 Claudie Blakley as Tracey 
 Nathan Constance as Chum

Critical reception
The film received generally positive reviews from critics. The review aggregator website Rotten Tomatoes reports that the film has a 67% approval rating, based on 27 reviews. The website's consensus reads, "With its grimy sets, taut storyline, and relentless sense of doom, London to Brighton is an auspicious directorial debut by Paul Andrew Williams." Metacritic reports that the film has an average score of 55 out of 100, based on seven critics, indicating "mixed or average reviews".

Awards and nominations
The film won a British Independent Film Award for Best Achievement in Production. Williams won the Golden Hitchcock award at the Dinard Festival of British Cinema, the New Director's Award at the Edinburgh International Film Festival, Best Feature Film at the Foyle Film Festival, and a Jury Prize at the Raindance Film Festival.

References

Further reading
 Stella Hockenhull, "An Aesthetic Approach to Contemporary British Social Realism: London to Brighton", Film and Romantic special issue, Jeffrey Crouse (ed.), Film International, Vol. 7, No. 6, December 2009

External links
London to Brighton official website - Web Archive

DVD review - London to Brighton guardian.co.uk, 30 April 2007
London to Brighton Times Online, 30 November 2006
London To Brighton (2006) BBC - Movies, 24 November 2006
London to Brighton (2006) Timeout London, 29 November 2006
London to Brighton - Trailer YouTube
Vidiyum Munn Vidiyum Munn - Tamil Movie - Inspired by London to Brighton

2006 films
British crime films
Films set in Brighton
Films set in London
Films about prostitution in the United Kingdom
Social realism in film
Vertigo Films films
2000s crime films
2000s English-language films
2000s British films